Wootton Bassett Road railway station was opened on 17 December 1840 as Hay Lane as the temporary terminus of the Great Western Railway (GWR) when it was extended from Faringdon Road.

Basic locomotive facilities were provided here, and stagecoaches carried passengers to Bath, where they could join another GWR train for the remainder of the journey to Bristol.

References

Disused railway stations in Wiltshire
Former Great Western Railway stations
Railway stations in Great Britain opened in 1840
Railway stations in Great Britain closed in 1841